Hasanabad-e Band (also Romanized as Ḩasanābād-e Band; also known as Ḩasanābād, Ḩoseynābād, and Husainābād) is a village in Nur Ali Beyk Rural District, in the Central District of Saveh County, Markazi Province, Iran. At the 2006 census, its population was 49, in 12 families.

References 

Populated places in Saveh County